The 2006 British Grand Prix (officially the 2006 Formula 1 Foster's British Grand Prix) was a Formula One motor race held on 11 June 2006 at the Silverstone Circuit in Northamptonshire, England. The 60-lap race was the eighth round of the 2006 Formula One season.

Ticket sales were rather slow; the race was scheduled far earlier than normal, and local Jenson Button had a rather poor season the previous year. When the race sold out in 2005, Button had been coming off one of his best years. Also, the weekend clashed with England's first World Cup game. Jacques Villeneuve and Juan Pablo Montoya both scored their final World Championship points by finishing in eighth and sixth respectively.

Button had a very poor qualifying run and started the race 19th; after a blinding first few laps, Jenson's engine caught fire on lap 9, due to an oil leak that also caused the car to spin out of the race. Scotsman David Coulthard also had a poor race suffering from understeer.

Fernando Alonso became the first Spanish driver and the youngest driver (24 years and 317 days) to get a hat trick (pole position, winning and fastest lap in the same race). He fell one lap short of clinching a Grand Chelem (leading every lap, he would finally achieve this at the 2010 Singapore Grand Prix).

This race also featured the first ever pit stop to have involved a woman, during a Midland F1 pit stop for Tiago Monteiro, ITV-F1's then pit-lane reporter Louise Goodman was the left rear tyre changer.

The only other noticeable incident of the race happened on the first lap, when Scott Speed pushed Ralf Schumacher's Toyota right in the path of Mark Webber at the entrance on the Hangar Straight. Schumacher and Webber retired on the spot, while Speed crawled to the pits and drove straight into the garage at the end of lap 1.

Friday drivers
The bottom 6 teams in the 2005 Constructors' Championship and Super Aguri were entitled to run a third car in free practice on Friday. These drivers drove on Friday but did not compete in qualifying or the race.

Classification

Qualifying

Notes
  – Takuma Sato was handed a 10 place grid penalty following a chassis and engine change after the Saturday morning practice session.

Race

Championship standings after the race

Drivers' Championship standings

Constructors' Championship standings

 Note: Only the top five positions are included for both sets of standings.

See also 
 2006 Silverstone GP2 Series round

References

External links

 Detailed British Grand Prix results (archived)

Race reports
 Formula1.com (archived)
 GPUpdate.net
 Motorsport.com
 ManipeF1.com (archived)

British Grand Prix
British Grand Prix
Grand Prix
British Grand Prix